Phi Rho Sigma is a professional fraternity founded by medical students at Northwestern University in 1890.

Early History

Its founder were:
 Milbank Johnson
 T. J. Robeson
 H. H. Forline
 J. A. Poling

These nine representatives were elected yearly and the body was known as the Grand Chapter. They elected their own officers and had full power to grant charters, enact laws, and perform other duties devolving upon them. By this body charters were granted to Delta, Epsilon and Zeta. A revised constitution was adopted , which specifies that the grand chapter shall consist of two delegates from each chapter, and that it shall hold its meetings biennially. In accordance with this act the first general convention was called to Chicago, –. From this meeting dates in reality the national scope of the fraternity. In the interim between conventions the executive power of the fraternity is vested in a Grand Council composed of seven members who all reside in the same vicinity.

Conventions have been held as of  biennially.

Chapter Formation and Later History
Many of the chapters were formed from prior existing organizations. It was allowed to retain its name as a chapter designation although its name is not in harmony with the fraternity's system of chapter nomenclature. The Hamline Medical College where the Theta chapter was located united with the Medical department of the University of Minnesota where the Tau chapter was located and the two chapters united under the name of Theta Tau chapter. In  the Omaha Medical College where Iota chapter is located became the medical department of the University of Nebraska, and as part of the instruction was carried on at Lincoln and part at Omaha, the chapter divided into two parts Iota-Alpha chapter at Lincoln and Iota-Beta chapter at Omaha. All of the medical course is now given at the State University and thus those chapters are once again consolidated. The Iota chapter publishes a small magazine called the Iota. The Ohio State chapter was formerly a chapter of Phi Delta. The Upsilon chapter was originally at the University College of Medicine which was merged into the Medical College of Virginia. Omicron chapter was originally at the Wisconsin College of Physicians and Surgeons which was merged into Marquette University.

On , a merger agreement was signed in Cincinnati by the authorities of Chi Zeta Chi Fraternity to merge into Phi Rho Sigma.

In  the Grand Chapter established a group of national awards in the form of gold medals, given biennially at the Grand Chapter meeting.

The Irving S. Cutter Medal is presented to a member of the Society who has provided extraordinary service to the field of medicine.
The Jesse Ansley Griffin Medal is awarded to a Phi Rho who has given outstanding service to the Society over the past years.
The student medal, the Paul McLain Student Research Award, is given to a student member who has done significant research while in medical school. Dr. McLain was a physician and scientist who dedicated his life to the education of the medical student. Winners get both a gold medal and a cash award and will present their research at the Grand Chapter.

The Fraternity welcomes suggestions from alumni for the Cutter and Griffin Medals.

Certificates of Meritorious Service may also be given out by the Grand Chapter.

Chapters
The chapter roll is as follows: Some names reflect the chapter's origin as a previous local fraternity. Chi series chapters indicate those originating as Chi Zeta Chi, such as Chi Alpha, or merged chapters where the Chi Zeta Chi chapter was oldest, or the only active chapter of the two. Bold indicates a chapter that is active.
 - Alpha - Northwestern University
 - Gamma - University of Chicago (includes Rush) (dormant in 1969, had merged with Beta chapter in 1936)
 - Delta - University of Southern California (dormant in 1969)
 - Epsilon - Detroit College of Medicine and Surgery (dormant in 1965)
 - Zeta - University of Michigan
 - Eta - Creighton University (dormant, 1973-19xx. Later known as Eta Tau chapter.)
 - Theta - Hamline Medical College (united with Tau in 1907 to form Theta Tau chapter) 
 - Iota - University of Nebraska
 - Kappa - Case Western Reserve University
 - Lambda Phi - Medico-Chirurgical College (Perelman, UPenn) (dormant in 1973)
 - Mu - University of Iowa
 - Nu - Harvard University  (dormant in 1923)
1903 - Xi - Johns Hopkins University (dormant in 1904)
 - Omicron - Marquette University (dormant in 1921)
 - Pi - Indiana University Bloomington (Indianapolis)
1903 - Chi Alpha - University of Georgia
1904 - Chi Beta - Emory University  (dormant in 1959)
1904 - Chi Gamma - University of Maryland (dormant in 1936)
 - Rho - Thomas Jefferson University (dormant in 1965)
 - Sigma - University of Virginia (dormant in 1929)
1905 - Tau - later Theta Tau - University of Minnesota
1906 - Chi Delta - University of South Carolina 
1906 - Chi Epsilon - University of Tennessee
1906 - Chi Eta - Saint Louis University School of Medicine
1906 - Chi Zeta - University of Arkansas (dormant in 1939)
 - Upsilon - Medical College of Virginia (dormant in 1943)
 - Phi - University of Pennsylvania (see Lambda Phi chapter)
 - S&S - Yale University (dormant in 1919)
 - Chi - University of Pittsburgh (dormant in 1970)
 - Psi - University of Colorado (dormant in 1972)
1911 - Alpha Omicron Delta - University at Buffalo (dormant in 1931)
1913 - Omega - Ohio State University (dormant in 1943)
1913 - Alpha Beta - Columbia University (dormant in 1932)
1913 - Alpha Gamma - McGill University (dormant in 1938)
1918 - Delta Omicron Alpha - Tulane University (dormant in 1950)
1921 - Alpha Delta - University of Washington (dormant in 1944)
1922 - Alpha Epsilon - University of Toronto (dormant in 1942)
1923 - Alpha Zeta - Stanford University (dormant in 1959)
1924 - Chi Theta - Wake Forest University (dormant in 1965)
1925 - Alpha Eta - Dalhousie University 
1927 - Alpha Theta - University of Cincinnati (dormant in 1935)
1929 - Alpha Iota - University of Manitoba (dormant in 1944)
1932 - Alpha Kappa - University of Rochester (dormant in 1938)
1933 - Alpha Lambda - Temple University
1935 - Alpha Mu - Louisiana State University (dormant in 1941)
1939 - Alpha Nu - University of Texas
1939 - Alpha Omicron - University of Texas Southwestern Medical Center (dormant between 1944–56)
1948 - Alpha Pi - University of Utah (dormant in 1965)
1958 - Alpha Rho - Seton Hall University (dormant in 1969)
1964 - Iota Gamma - University of California, Irvine School of Medicine (dormant in 1974)
2012 - Alpha Upsilon - Wright State University

As of : Active chapters 28, inactive 2. Membership 4,498. As reported at that time, "The Nebraska, Minnesota, and Michigan chapters own houses."

Chi Zeta Chi chapters
ACTIVE CHAPTERS
Alpha University of Georgia 
Beta College of Physicians and Surgeons 
Gamma New York Polyclinic Medical College 
Delta University of Maryland
Epsilon College of Physicians and Surgeons 
Zeta Baltimore Medical College
Eta Johns Hopkins University 
Theta Vanderbilt University 
Iota South Carolina Medical College 
Kappa Atlanta School of Medicine
Lambda College of Physicians and Surgeons 
Mu Tulane University 
Nu University of Arkansas 
Xi St. Louis University 
Omicron Washington University 
Pi College of Physicians and Surgeons 
Rho College of Physicians and Surgeons 
Sigma George Washington University
Tau Jefferson Medical College 
Upsilon Fordham University 
Phi Lincoln University 
Chi Long Island Medical College 
Psi Medical College of Virginia
Omega Birmingham Medical College

Symbols
The fraternity issues a periodical called the Phi Rho Sigma Journal. As of  it is published twice a year. In  a history and directory edited by Dr. D. E. W. Wenstrand of Milwaukee was published. This was a large octavo volume with many illustrations.

The colors of the fraternity are scarlet and gold.

Other professional medical fraternities
In addition to the medical fraternities listed here, there are numerous chiropractic, pre-health, pharmacy and nursing fraternities.
 Alpha Delta Theta, medical technology
 Alpha Gamma Kappa
 Alpha Kappa Kappa
 Alpha Phi Sigma, see Phi Delta Epsilon 
 Alpha Tau Sigma, Osteopathic, dormant
 Mu Sigma Phi, Philippines
 Nu Sigma Nu
 Omega Tau Sigma, veterinary medicine
 Omega Upsilon Phi, see Phi Beta Pi
 Phi Alpha Gamma, formerly Homeopathic, see Phi Chi
 Phi Beta Pi
 Phi Chi
 Phi Delta Epsilon
 Phi Kappa Mu, Philippines
 Phi Lambda Kappa
 Sigma Mu Delta, pre-medical
 Theta Kappa Psi

See also
Phi Rho Sigma homepage

References

Professional medical fraternities and sororities in the United States
Student organizations established in 1890
Former members of Professional Fraternity Association
1890 establishments in Illinois